Rosso (Rossendale Transport Limited) is a bus operator providing local services in Greater Manchester, Lancashire and West Yorkshire, England. It is a subsidiary of Transdev Blazefield, which operates bus services across Greater Manchester, Lancashire, North Yorkshire and West Yorkshire.

History
The company's history dates back to December 1907, when both Haslingden Corporation Transport and Rawtenstall Corporation Transport first ran a motor bus within their boroughs. In 1968, both undertakings merged to form the Rossendale Joint Transport Committee.

Following local government reorganisation in April 1974, the boroughs were merged, along with nearby Bacup and Whitworth, forming the present-day Borough of Rossendale.

In 1986, as part of the deregulation of bus services and to comply with the Transport Act 1985, the company's assets were transferred to a new legal entity.

The company expanded over the following twenty years, operating local buses in Bury, Rochdale and Rossendale, as well as neighbouring Blackburn, Bolton, Burnley and Todmorden.

In September 1990, a new depot was established in Rochdale, in order to support new routes introduced in the town following the deregulation of bus services.

In September 2008, the company's main depot and office facilities were moved from Rawtenstall to Haslingden, with the former buildings subsequently demolished.

In early 2009, concerns were raised about the council's intentions, in relation to their continued ownership of the company. It culminated in a public protest outside Rawtenstall Town Hall, with the aim of dissuading Rossendale Borough Council from selling. In July 2009, the council announced that it was retaining its ownership of the company, with an acceptable valuation not having been met by any potentially interested parties.

In August 2013, the network was rebranded, with a new livery design of red, orange, yellow and white. At the same time, the company was renamed Rosso.

Following the granting of approval on 20 December 2017, the company was sold by Rossendale Borough Council on 12 January 2018. The sale saw the company's 240 staff and 102 vehicles join Transdev Blazefield – a move which saw the investment of £3 million in a new fleet of high-specification vehicles for routes in and around Bury, Rochdale and Rossendale.

In April 2018, the company's Haslingden depot, which opened ten years earlier, was closed. Staff and vehicles were reassigned within the business to nearby depots across Lancashire.

Services and branding

464 
The 464 service operates between Accrington and Rochdale via Rawtenstall up to every 15 minutes, with a half-hourly frequency during the evening and on Sunday. This route is operated by a fleet of Optare Versa single-deck vehicles branded in a two-tone purple and pink livery. Features include free Wifi, USB and wireless charging and audio-visual next stop announcements.

Bury Bolts 
The Bury Bolts brand encompasses a number of local services operating in and around the town of Bury. Services are operated by a fleet of Alexander Dennis Enviro 200 single-deck vehicles, branded in a two-tone yellow livery. Routes Include:B1 (Bury - Woodhill - Burrs - Summerseat - Ramsbottom - Peel Brow), B2 (Bury - Fernhill - Chesham - Limefield - Nangreaves), B3 (Bury - Pimhole - Ferngrove) & B4 (Bury - Pimhole - Fairfield - Jericho - Heywood).

Irwell Line 
The Irwell Line brand encompasses two services, which operate along the Irwell Valley. The routes operate between Blackburn (481) or Burnley (483) and Bury via Rawtenstall. Services are operated by a fleet of Volvo B7RLE/Wright Eclipse Urban single-deck vehicles, branded in a two-tone teal and yellow livery. Features include free WiFi, USB charging and audio-visual next stop announcements.

Lakeline 
The Lakeline brand encompasses two services (457 and 458), which operate between Littleborough and Rochdale via Smallbridge. Services are operated by a fleet of Wright Streetlite single-deck vehicles, branded in a two-tone blue and yellow livery. Features include free WiFi and USB charging.

Rochdale Runners 
The Rochdale Runners brand encompasses a number of local services operating in and around the town of Rochdale. Services are operated by a fleet of Alexander Dennis Enviro 200 single-deck vehicles, branded in a two-tone yellow livery.

Rossendale Rovers 
Launched in January 2021, Rossendale Rovers is a brand encompassing a number of local services operating in and around the Rossendale Valley. Services are operated by a fleet of Optare Solo single-deck vehicles, branded in a two-tone yellow livery. Features include audio-visual next stop announcements.

Tottington Line 
Tottington Line is the brand for service 469, which operates between Bury and Tottington up to every 15 minutes, with a half-hourly service during the evening and on Sunday. The service is operated by a fleet of Wright Streetlite single-deck vehicles, branded in a two-tone green and yellow livery. Features include free WiFi and USB charging.

Trax 
The Trax brand encompasses two services (467 and 468), which operate between Bury and Rochdale via Bamford at a combined half-hourly frequency. Services are operated by a fleet of Wright Streetlite single-deck vehicles, branded in a two-tone orange and yellow livery. Features include free WiFi and USB charging.

Fleet and operations

Depots
As of April 2022, the company operates from a single depot in Rochdale, as well as sharing Burnley depot with The Burnley Bus Company.

Vehicles 
As of April 2022, the fleet consists of in the region of 100 buses. The fleet consists of diesel-powered single and double-deck buses manufactured by Alexander Dennis, Optare, Volvo and Wrightbus.

References

Sources

 Postlethwaite, H. (2007). Rossendale Transport: A Centenary Celebration 1907–2007. Venture Publications. .

External links
 
 Rossendale Transport Limited on Companies House
 Rosso website

Bus operators in Greater Manchester
Bus operators in Lancashire
Borough of Rossendale
Transdev
Transport companies established in 1907
1907 establishments in England